Charles Edward (Ted) Thomas  (born 30 December 1927) is a British Church of England priest, most notably Archdeacon of Wells from 1983 to 1993.

Thomas was educated at St David's College, Lampeter and the College of the Resurrection, Mirfield. He was ordained deacon in 1953,  and priest in 1954. After a curacy in Ilminster he was Chaplain of St Michael's College, Tenbury. After another curacy in St Albans he was Vicar of St Michael and All Angels, Boreham Wood from 1958 to 1966. He was Rector of Monksilver from 1966 to 1974; then Vicar of South Petherton from 1974 until 1983.

References

1927 births
Archdeacons of Wells
Possibly living people
Alumni of the University of Wales, Lampeter
Alumni of the College of the Resurrection